James S. Clarkson (May 17, 1842 – May 30, 1918) was a delegate to each Republican National Convention from 1876 to 1896; a member of the Republican National Committee from 1880 to 1896; chairman of the Committee from 1891 to 1892, and President of the Republican League of the United States from 1891 to 1893. He was born in Brookville, Indiana but raised a native of Polk County, Iowa.  He married Anna Howell, and together they had three children.

He served as postmaster of Des Moines from 1871 to 1877, and was twice offered an ambassadorship (to Switzerland in 1869, and to China in 1890), but declined both.

On April 18, 1902, he was appointed by Theodore Roosevelt as surveyor of the Port of New York until 1910.

He died at the home of his son Grosvenor in Newark, New Jersey with his wife by his side. Clarkson was buried in the family mausoleum in Des Moines, Iowa.

References

1842 births
1918 deaths
Iowa Republicans
People from Brookville, Indiana
Republican National Committee chairs